SRM Valliammai Engineering College is an autonomous engineering institution located in Kattankulathur, Tamil Nadu. It was established on 9 September 1999. The college functions from a ten–storey building complex of 29,000 square metres to accommodate the demands of students. The Valliammai Engineering College is a part of the SRM Group of Educational Institutions, sponsored by the Valliammai Society. The Institution is certified with ISO 9001:2015 from TUV Rheinland.

Campus location
The college is situated by the side of NH 45, between Tambaram and Chengalpattu. It is an adjoining campus to SRM University, Kattankulathur, Chennai.

Administration
This college is administrated by Thiru Ravi Pachamoothu as the Chairman, Mrs.R.Padmapriya as Vice-Chairman, Ms.R.Harini as Correspondent, Dr.B.Chidhambararajan as Director, and Dr. M. Murugan as Principal, have been utilizing their expertise in the upbringing of the institution, under the guidance of Founder Chairman Dr.T.R.Paarivendhar.

Technical fiestas and symposiums

References

External links
 https://www.srmvalliammai.ac.in

Engineering colleges in Chennai
Colleges affiliated to Anna University
Educational institutions established in 1999
1999 establishments in Tamil Nadu